Razići (Cyrillic: Разићи) is a settlement in the municipality of Konjic, Bosnia and Herzegovina, and the northern hamlet of the village of Glavatičevo.

Demographics 
According to the 2013 census, its population was 59.

References

Populated places in Konjic
Glavatičevo